Choremis is a village and a community of the municipality of Megalopoli, Arcadia, Greece. Since the 1970s it is situated on the left bank of the river Alfeios, which was rerouted for the lignite mines further east. It is 3 km northwest of Tripotamo, 4 km south of Thoknia and 5 km southwest of Megalopoli. The community consists of the villages Choremis and Apiditsa (pop. 32 in 2011).

Population

See also
List of settlements in Arcadia

References

External links
 Choremis on GTP Travel Pages

Megalopolis, Greece
Populated places in Arcadia, Peloponnese